Herbert Wachter (born 4 May 1940) is an Austrian cross-country skier. He competed at the 1972 Winter Olympics and the 1976 Winter Olympics.

References

1940 births
Living people
Austrian male cross-country skiers
Olympic cross-country skiers of Austria
Cross-country skiers at the 1972 Winter Olympics
Cross-country skiers at the 1976 Winter Olympics
Sportspeople from Villach
20th-century Austrian people